The European Union Agency for Railways (ERA) is an agency of the European Union (EU) that sets mandatory requirements for European railways and manufacturers in the form of Technical Specifications for Interoperability (TSI), which apply to the Trans-European Rail system. The ERA publishes a document summarising the status of the TSIs. The ERA sets common safety targets, common safety methods and common safety indicators, following Directive 2004/49/EC and amendments. The ERA also hosts a number of databases, among which a register of remaining, applicable national rules.

History

The agency was established in 2004 as part of the Second Railway Package, and commenced operations in 2006 as the European Railway Agency (ERA). It changed its name in 2016, becoming the European Union Agency for Railways. The acronym ERA is still used to refer to the agency after the renaming, even by the agency itself.

See also
Rail transport in Europe
European Rail Infrastructure Managers

Notes

External links

 European Railway Agency website

Agencies of the European Union
Transport and the European Union
Rail transport in Europe
2004 establishments in France
2004 in the European Union
Government agencies established in 2004
International organizations based in France
Valenciennes
Transport organizations based in France